Júlio Campos (born January 15, 1982, in Curitiba) is a Brazilian auto racing driver. He currently drives in the Stock Car Brasil and Copa Fiat Brasil series.

Campos won the Formula Dodge National Championship in 2001 and Pick Up Racing Brazil in 2009. He is brother of the deceased driver Marco Campos, who died in an accident in a Formula 3000 race at the Circuit de Nevers Magny-Cours, making him the only driver ever killed in the International Formula 3000 series.

Racing record

Career summary

Racing career

American Open-Wheel racing results
(key) (Races in bold indicate pole position, races in italics indicate fastest race lap)

Barber Dodge Pro Series

Stock Car Brasil results

 Season still in progress

External links
 
 

1982 births
Living people
Brazilian racing drivers
Stock Car Brasil drivers
Sportspeople from Curitiba
24 Hours of Daytona drivers
Barber Pro Series drivers
Brazilian WeatherTech SportsCar Championship drivers
Brazilian Formula Renault 2.0 drivers